And the Birds Rained Down is a 2019 Canadian drama film, directed by Louise Archambault. An adaptation of the novel by Jocelyne Saucier, the film centres on a group of senior citizens living off-the-grid in a wilderness setting, whose orderly and quiet lives are threatened by changes in their personal group dynamics after the death of the group leader and the arrival of a new outsider.

The film's cast includes Rémy Girard, Gilbert Sicotte, Andrée Lachapelle, Ève Landry, Louise Portal, Éric Robidoux, Marie-Ginette Guay and Kenneth Welsh. It was Lachapelle's final film role before her death, and one of the last film roles for Welsh before his.

Premise
Ted (Welsh), Charlie (Sicotte) and Tom (Girard) are three elderly men who have withdrawn from society, and are living off-the-grid at a wilderness cabin. Their only connection to the outside world is Steve (Éric Robidoux), the manager of a hotel in the nearby town who visits weekly to bring them food and supplies in exchange for a share of the marijuana that they illegally grow onsite.

One morning, however, Ted dies in his sleep; as he was effectively the group leader, this leaves Charlie and Tom a bit out of sorts. Soon afterward, their lives are further disrupted when Steve brings his aunt Gertrude (Lachapelle), who does not want to return to the assisted living facility where she has been living for many years, to live with them; she further decides to break from her past by dropping the name Gertrude and going by Marie-Desneige. At the same time Raf (Landry), a local photographer who is trying to document the relatively few remaining survivors of a forest fire that devastated the region decades earlier, arrives in search of Ted. Meanwhile, there is the threat of another forest fire nearby that may further disrupt their lives.

Release
The film premiered at the 2019 Toronto International Film Festival, and was commercially released to theatres in September 2019.

Critical response
Jonathan Holland of The Hollywood Reporter wrote that "The stage is thus set for an On Golden Pond-style, comfortable third-age drama with a light comic edge, but Birds ends up going much deeper and darker than that as the script, driven along by beautifully nuanced performances from its central trio, leads us into some quite unexpected areas. The first, wonderful exchange of glances between Gertrude and Charlie (on arrival, she symbolically casts away her troubled institutionalized past by renaming herself “Marie-Desneige”) indeed develops into a tremulous octogenarian love affair as Charlie takes her under his wing and shows her a whole new life, not just of stolen, old-folk kisses but of full-blown sensuality. Their nighttime conversations across a darkened room — like those of kids in summer camp, except they’re 80 — are among the pic’s most memorable scenes as their inevitably painful back stories start to emerge."

Norman Wilner of Now rated the film four N's, writing that "It’s muted and moving, patiently assembling its characters and gliding alongside them, offering us a sense of individual stories coming together. The narrative balances its familiarity with texture and feeling there aren’t too many surprises, but Archambault offers a specificity – a sense of people and place – that grows richer and more moving as her film unfolds." He particularly praised the performances of Sicotte, Girard and Lachapelle, writing that "Sicotte and Girard are enthralling as the aging heroes, who treasure their shared solitude but are willing to welcome people in need, and Lachapelle – who died last fall – delivers an exquisitely felt valedictory performance as a woman experiencing life for the first time."

Janet Smith of The Georgia Straight wrote that "what stands out most is the fully fleshed old folks here—figuratively as well as literally. With few words, Sicotte and Lachapelle show stirrings rarely portrayed in the elderly, and not just the erotic kind. The octagenarians’ subtle lessons about living in the moment should translate easily to anyone decades younger."

Accolades
In December 2019, the film was named to TIFF's annual year-end Canada's Top Ten list.

The film was nominated for five Canadian Screen Awards, with Girard winning for Best Supporting Actor.

References

External links
 

2019 films
Canadian drama films
Films directed by Louise Archambault
Films based on Canadian novels
2019 drama films
Canadian films about cannabis
2010s French-language films
French-language Canadian films
2010s Canadian films